The Southern League was resurrected in 1952 as the regional third tier of speedway racing in the United Kingdom for Southern British teams as a replacement for the defunct National League Division Three. The league ran for two seasons before being replaced by the Southern Area League. The champions of both seasons were Rayleigh Rockets

Champions

See also
List of United Kingdom Speedway League Champions

References

Speedway leagues
Speedway competitions in the United Kingdom
1952 in British motorsport
1953 in British motorsport